The Men's individual pursuit tandem B1-3 track cycling event at the 2004 Summer Paralympics was competed on 18 & 19 September. It was won by Kieran Modra and his sighted pilot Robert Crowe, representing .

Qualifying

18 Sept. 2004, 14:00

1st round

19 Sept. 2004, 10:15

Heat 1

Heat 2

Heat 3

Heat 4

Final round

19 Sept. 2004, 12:00
Gold

Bronze

References

M